Striatoguraleus himaeformis is a species of sea snail, a marine gastropod mollusk in the family Horaiclavidae. The length of the nassariiform shell attains 6.2 mm. This marine species occurs off KwaZulu-Natal to Cape Province, South Africa

References

 Kilburn, R. N. "Turridae (Mollusca: Gastropoda) of southern Africa and Mozambique. Part 7. Subfamily Crassispirinae, section 2." Annals of the Natal Museum 35.1 (1994): 177–228

External links
  Tucker, J.K. 2004 Catalog of recent and fossil turrids (Mollusca: Gastropoda). Zootaxa 682:1–1295.

Endemic fauna of South Africa
himaeformis
Gastropods described in 1994